Ilarduia is a village located in the municipality of Asparrena, between the mountain of Albeniz (1,011 m) and the mountain range of Urbasa, in the bank of the river Zirauntza. This is a flat area also considered to be placed in a natural passage formed by the mountains of Altzaina (North) and the mountain range of Entzia (South) in the vicinity of Burunda's lands in Navarre.

History 

The historic precedents carry us to the prehistory whose first evidences of population had appeared in a group of an archaeological sites: since the Neolithic (Ameztutxo) to the Age of Bronce (the cave of the Gentiles) and the Age of Iron. The Romanization is visible in some of the tombstones of the hermitage of Arzanegui. The human presence and the subsequent in written history, can be explained because of the location of the natural passage which is the Path of Burunda. This one, makes easier the communication between the east–west direction. Exactly, the Roman road that joined Astorga with Burdeos just crossed through this path.

Village centre 

The village centre does not have a particular urban order though it conserves a route with a lineal direction. Between its urban ensemble they stand out two houses of the whole. These houses were catalogued by the council as historic and architectural patrimony of Ilarduia. The first one (27. "Casa ilarduia 2") is a nobleman's house which has a white stone badge above the entrance that never came to be worked. Constructed in masonry, its front facade, with a rectangular floor and a three slope roofs. The origin of this house could carry us back in time to the 17th century. The other house (28. "Casa elizalde 11") has a popular nature and is also rectangular. The ground floor was constructed in masonry and stonework. However the first floor was constructed with a projecting framework body and an exposed brickwork finish.

The parochial church was dedicated to San Miguel and rebuilt in the 17th century because of the deterioration of the previous one. Nowadays there is an adjoining unit converted in a Gaztetxe (a self-managed social centre in Basque) which has no inner connection to the church and it has an external entrance.

Population

Rural carnivals 
Rural carnivals take place in different villages of the Basque Country, Navarre and the French Basque Country. They are the popular pagan celebrations which usually take place the three following days of the Ash Wednesday. The rural carnivals of Ilarduia where recuperated ensemble with the ones of Egino and Andoin, because of this, they celebrate them all together.

Recuperation 
The civil war banned this type of celebrations and in 2007 the villages gathered with the intention of recuperate these carnivals. AHIK (Arabako Herri Inauteriak Kultur Elkartea / Asociación de Carnavales Rurales de Álava) collaborated and started the process of recuperation of the rural carnivals. The elders of the three villages met together and made testimonies of the characteristics of this celebration. Moreover, in 2008 they made drawings of all the characters and in 2009 they created the first poster of five zones of Alava:Ilarduia, Egino and Andoin (Asparrena), Valle de Kuartango, Salcedo, Santa Cruz de Campezo and Zalduondo.

See also
 Asparrena
 Basque Country
 Ash Wednesday

References

External links
 http://www.asparrena.eus/pueblos/ilarduia
 https://pgouasparrena.files.wordpress.com/2012/12/10953_11_imi_patrimonio.pdf

Municipalities in Álava